The National Archives of Ghana were located in Accra. The efforts to create an archive started in 1946 and the first Ghanaian chief archivist was J. M. Akita in 1949. The National Archives was replaced by the Public Records and Archives Administration Department in 1997.

A department was established in the Government's Agent's office, Kumasi on 3 August 1959. The original intention was to house archives for the Ashanti, Brong-Ahafo and Northern Ghana regions. A further office was subsequently opened in the regional administration offices in Tamale, capital of the Northern Region.

See also 
 Unesco Memory of the World Register – Africa
 List of national archives

References

Bibliography 

 Dumett, R. E.

External links 
 http://www.praad.gov.gh

Ghana
Cultural organisations based in Ghana
History of Ghana